The State Museum of Turkmenistan (Turkmen: Türkmenistanyň Döwlet Muzeýi), also known as the Saparmurat Turkmenbashi Museum, is a museum in Turkmenistan. The museum was opened on 12 November 1998. The museum has seven permanent galleries incorporating history, present day culture, and ethnography.

Collections
As of 2013, the museum was split into three sections:  natural history, science, and the President of Turkmenistan.  Photography is forbidden in any part of the museum, and all visitors are followed by a museum employee during their stay.  Many artifacts and photographs are clear fakes or digitally edited.

Natural History
The museum contains a large collection of ancient artifacts.  However many are overly intricate, in pristine condition, and many thousand years old leading to questions about their authenticity.

President
The museum has one third of its floor space dedicated to the current President of Turkmenistan.  In this section are images of the president doing a wide variety of things, including harvesting crops with his citizens, racing autos, reading with children, playing sports, and meeting world leaders.

Science
The section of the museum dedicated to science has no English captions, even though the rest of the museum does.

See also
Neutrality Arch, Ashgabat, Turkmenistan

References

External links

The State Museum of the State Cultural Center of Turkmenistan 
Ashgabat Photo Gallery

Museums established in 1998
Museums in Turkmenistan
Turkmenistan
Archaeological museums
Ethnographic museums in Asia
History museums